Cleary may refer to:

 Cleary (surname), people with the surname Cleary
 Cleary, Mississippi, a census-designated place, United States
 Cleary, Missouri, a ghost town, United States
 Cleary University, a private business school, Michigan, United States
 Cleary Gottlieb Steen & Hamilton, an international law firm